Mr. Jones is an album by American jazz drummer Elvin Jones recorded in 1972 and released on the Blue Note label in 1973. The track "G. G." was erroneously listed on the original LP as "Gee Gee".

Reception
The Allmusic review awarded the album 4½ stars.

Track listing
 "One's Native Place" (Keiko Jones) - 6:16
 "G. G." (Gene Perla) - 5:45
 "Mr. Jones" (Jones) - 7:34
 "What's Up? - That's It" (Perla) - 5:37
 "Soultrane" (Tadd Dameron) - 6:12
 "New Breed" (Dave Liebman) - 6:55

Recorded on September 26, 1969 (track 3), July 12, 1972 (tracks 4, 6), July 13, 1972 (tracks 1, 2, 5)

Personnel
Elvin Jones - drums
Dave Liebman - tenor saxophone (2, 6), soprano saxophone (4), flute (1)
Steve Grossman - tenor saxophone (2, 4-6), soprano saxophone (1)
Jan Hammer - piano
Gene Perla - bass (1, 3-6), electric bass (2)
Carlos "Patato" Valdes - congas (1, 4)
Frank Ippolito - percussion (1, 4, 5)
Pepper Adams - baritone saxophone (4)
Thad Jones - flugelhorn (1-3, 5)
Albert Duffy - timpani (1-3, 5)

References

Blue Note Records albums
Elvin Jones albums
1973 albums
Albums produced by Francis Wolff
Albums produced by George Butler (record producer)
Albums recorded at Van Gelder Studio